Akçaşehir (literally "quite white city/town" in Turkish) may refer to the following places in Turkey:

 Akçaşehir, Karaman, a town in the district of Karaman, Karaman Province, Turkey
 Akçaşehir, Gerede, a village in the district of Gerede, Bolu Province, Turkey

See also
 Akçakoca, formerly Akçaşehir